Roberto de Almeida (born April 5, 1955), commonly known as Beto Almeida, is a Brazilian football manager.

Managerial statistics

References

External links

1955 births
Living people
Sportspeople from Porto Alegre
Brazilian football managers
Expatriate football managers in Japan
Expatriate football managers in Bahrain
Expatriate football managers in Paraguay
J2 League managers
Kawasaki Frontale managers
Esporte Clube São José managers
Clube Esportivo Bento Gonçalves managers
Esporte Clube Juventude managers
Grêmio Esportivo Brasil managers
Veranópolis Esporte Clube Recreativo e Cultural managers
Club Guaraní managers
Esporte Clube Pelotas managers
Esporte Clube São Luiz managers
Centro Sportivo Alagoano managers
Agremiação Sportiva Arapiraquense managers